Marc David Canham (born 11 September 1982) is a footballer who plays for Bath City as a midfielder.

Career
Born in Wegberg, North Rhine-Westphalia, Canham made his first team debut for Colchester United in a 1–0 defeat to Cardiff City on 6 April 2002. He joined Bournemouth on non-contract terms in 2003. After spending five seasons with Team Bath, he joined Hayes & Yeading United in July 2009. The club announced that he would be released when his contract expired on 30 June and he agreed to sign for Bath City on 1 July 2010.

References

External links

1982 births
Living people
English footballers
Association football midfielders
Colchester United F.C. players
AFC Bournemouth players
Team Bath F.C. players
Hayes & Yeading United F.C. players
Bath City F.C. players
English Football League players
National League (English football) players